Glen Augustus Holness (1957–24 June 1991), otherwise known by his stage name Nitty Gritty, was a popular reggae singer. Born in the August Town section of Kingston, Jamaica, he was the second of eleven children born to religious parents.

Biography
Holness formed The Soulites in the early 1970s and recorded his first solo single in the early 1980s for producer Sugar Minott. He worked on the Zodiac sound system and recorded further singles, working with George Phang before moving on to King Jammy in 1985, with whom he had his breakthrough success with "Hog inna Minty", a Jamaican folk song. Nitty Gritty was the first to record the song and was an instant success. He enjoyed further successful singles produced by Jammy, and his debut album, Turbo Charged was released in 1986, as was the split album with King Kong, Musical Confrontation. He moved to live in London before relocating to New York City, where he continued to record but less frequently. Further albums followed with General Penitentiary (1987), Nitty Gritty (1988), and Jah in the Family (1989).

On 24 June 1991, he was shot dead in front of Super Power Record Shop in Brooklyn, New York at the age of 34, for which deejay Super Cat was initially suspected yet later cleared.

Discography
Turbo Charged (1986), Greensleeves
Musical Confrontation (1986), Jammy's - with King Kong
General Penitentiary (1987), Black Victory
Nitty Gritty (1988), Witty's
Jah in the Family (1989), Blacka Dread
Powerhouse Presents (1989), with Tenor Saw

Compilations
Tribute to Nitty Gritty: Trials & Crosses (1994), VP
We Run Things (2002), Rhino - with Tenor Saw

References

External links
 Nitty Gritty at Roots Archives

Jamaican reggae musicians
1957 births
1991 deaths
Musicians from Kingston, Jamaica
20th-century Jamaican male singers
Greensleeves Records artists